Lomas Vóley is an Argentine volleyball club based in Lomas de Zamora. The club was founded in 2013 and takes part of Liga Argentina de Voleibol – Serie A1, the top level of the Argentine men's volleyball league system, since 2013–14 season, when it was runner-up

Titles

Domestic
Liga Argentina A1
Runner-up (1):2013–14
Bronze (2):2015–16, 2016-17

Copa ACLAV
First Place (1): 2016

Copa Máster
Runner-up (2): 2016, 2017

International
Men's South American Volleyball Club Championship 
Runner-up (1): 2018

Men's South American Volleyball Club Championship 
Bronze (1): 2015

External links

  Page Official

References 

Argentine volleyball teams